The chin is the lowermost part of the human face.

 Double chin, an extra layer of fat that protrudes from underneath the chin
 Cleft chin, a chin with a dimple in the center
 Chin-up, a strength training exercise
 Chin (combat sports), "a good chin", a fighter's ability to tolerate hard punches to the face without being knocked out
 Chinface, a comical performance where eyes are drawn on the chin and it is filmed upside-down

Chin may also refer to:

China
 Jin (disambiguation), romanized as Chin in Wade–Giles
 Qin (disambiguation), romanized as Ch'in in Wade–Giles

Myanmar
 Chin State, a state in Myanmar
 Chin people, the name of an ethnic group living in Myanmar and Bangladesh
 Chin languages, family of Tibeto-Burman languages

Personal names
 Chinn, or Chin, English surname
 Chin (surname), an alternate spelling for several East Asian surnames of Chinese origin:
 Qin (surname)
 Jin (Chinese surname)
 Qian (surname)
 Chen (surname)
 Vincent Gigante (1928–2005), a notorious mafioso, often referred to by his nickname "Chin"
 Chinawut Indracusin (born 1989), also known as "Chin", a Thai-French singer

Fictional characters
 The Crimson Chin, in the animated series The Fairly OddParents
 Chin Gentsai, in the video game series King of Fighters
 Chin the Conqueror, in the animated series Avatar: The Last Airbender 
 Grace Chin
 Chin, in the video game Hong Kong 97

Geography
 Chin, alternative name of China
 Chin, Alberta, a small hamlet in Canada
 Chin, Iran, a village in Chaharmahal and Bakhtiari Province, Iran
 Chin, Zanjan, a village in Zanjan Province, Iran
 Chin Rural District, in Kohgiluyeh and Boyer-Ahmad Province, Iran

Other
 Transliteration variant of the Chinese "Jin"
 Chin dynasty (disambiguation)
 Chin (Mayan god), a god in Mayan mythology
 Chinovnik, a rank given to a civil servant in Imperial Russia; the same term also refers to Euchologion, the liturgical book used by a bishop
 Japanese Chin, a dog breed

See also
 
 
Chic (disambiguation)
Chik (disambiguation)
 Qin (disambiguation)
 CHIN (disambiguation)
 China (disambiguation)
 Shin (disambiguation)

Language and nationality disambiguation pages